Edward Butler (10 April 1883 – 23 August 1916) was an Australian cricketer. He played two first-class matches for Tasmania between 1913 and 1915. He was killed in action during World War I. His uncle, Francis Butler, also played first-class cricket.

See also
 List of Tasmanian representative cricketers
 List of cricketers who were killed during military service

References

External links
 

1883 births
1916 deaths
Australian cricketers
Tasmania cricketers
Cricketers from Hobart
Australian Army officers
Military personnel from Tasmania
Australian military personnel killed in World War I